The 1930 French Grand Prix (formally titled the XXIV Grand Prix de l'A.C.F.) was a Grand Prix motor race held at Pau on 21 September 1930. The race was held over 25 laps of a 15.835 km circuit for a total race distance of 395.875 km and was won by Philippe Étancelin driving a Bugatti.  The race was notable for the fact that Tim Birkin came second in a 4.5 litre supercharged Bentley, which was a stripped-down road car.  

Pau had some Grand Prix traditions, as the town held the honour of arranging the first race ever to be called a Grand Prix back in 1901. For the 1930 Grand Prix a triangular, Le Mans-type track outside the city was selected. Known as the Circuit de Morlaas it should not be confused with the well-known street track in the Parque Beaumont. The French had hoped to run the race to the International Formula, but when the response was poor the event was postponed and changed to a Formula Libre event instead. The new date meant that the Italian teams were unable to attend, leaving it to be mostly an internal French affair with sixteen Bugattis, two Peugeots and a Delage among the twenty five starters. Among the top Bugatti drivers were Louis Chiron, Marcel Lehoux, Count Stanislas Czaikowski, Jean-Pierre Wimille, Philippe Étancelin and William Grover-Williams.

A curiosity in the largely single-seat entry list was Tim Birkin's  4½-litre supercharged "Blower Bentley" touring car, stripped down to racing trim, with headlights and mudguards removed. The race distance was twenty five laps of the 15.8 km track, making a total of 396 km. Guy Bouriat took an early lead, followed by Williams, Zanelli, Czaikowski and Étancelin, with Birkin as first non-Bugatti driver, in sixth place. Williams in a works Bugatti then became the next leader. Czaikowski fell back through the field and Bouriat in the other works Bugatti made a pitstop giving over the car to Chiron. Then Williams also had to make a stop for a new wheel. That all made way for Étancelin to advance and he was followed by Birkin, the track with its long straights suiting the supercharged Bentley perfectly.

At one-third distance Chiron led, followed by Étancelin, Williams and Birkin. Birkin's fourth place became a third as Williams got engine troubles but then Zanelli, who had made an early stop, came rushing through the field pushing Birkin back to fourth. At lap ten "Sabipa" crashed and was thrown out of his Bugatti, Birkin only avoiding the injured driver by the slightest of margins. After eleven laps Chiron encountered problems with oil pressure and Étancelin took over the lead. Soon Chiron was also passed by Zanelli and Birkin. The Bentley driver used his horn to warn the Bugatti to move over, surely a unique occurrence in Grand Prix racing! With seven laps to go Zanelli made another pitstop and Birkin was up into second place. While Étancelin, with a 2.5 minute lead, nursed his Bugatti home to take victory, Zanelli had not given up and was catching Birkin fast. At the flag the margin was down to fourteen seconds but it was enough for the British Bentley driver to make Grand Prix history, as this was the only occasion on which the iconic 4½-litre "Blower Bentley" was raced with any success. (It was the normally-aspirated 4½-litre and "Speed Six" models which had swept the board at Le Mans for the previous three years).

Starting Grid (3-3)

Classifications

Fastest Lap: "W.Williams", 6m10.0 (154.070 km/h)

Note – Chiron drove car 14 for laps 12-24.

References

External links

French Grand Prix
French Grand Prix
Grand Prix